The Evangelical Church in Zagreb is an Evangelical Lutheran Church located in centre of Zagreb (Donji Grad, close to the Republic of Croatia Square), Croatia. The church was originally built in period from 1882 until 1884. The building is a free-standing single-nave neo-Gothic church.

See also
Evangelical Reformed Church in Šidski Banovci

References

Hermann Bollé buildings
Churches completed in 1884
Religious buildings and structures in Zagreb
Donji grad, Zagreb
Churches in Croatia
Protestantism in Croatia